Stokeley Clevon Goulbourne (born April 18, 1996), known professionally as Ski Mask the Slump God (formerly stylized as $ki Mask "The Slump God"), is an American rapper. He initially rose to prominence alongside XXXTentacion and their collective Members Only. In 2017, he released the singles "BabyWipe" and "Catch Me Outside", both of which were featured on his mixtape You Will Regret (2017), which was certified Gold by the RIAA.

Goulbourne's mixtape, Beware the Book of Eli, was released in May 2018 and peaked at No. 50 on the Billboard 200 chart. His debut album Stokeley (2018) peaked at number 6 on the US Billboard 200.

Early life
Stokeley Clevon Goulbourne was born on April 18, 1996, in Fort Lauderdale, Florida. He is of Jamaican descent.

Goulbourne grew up listening to Busta Rhymes, Missy Elliott, Wu-Tang Clan, and Lil Wayne, among other artists. He has said that his parents often played Jamaican music around the house. Goulbourne's father—a rapper who used the stage name "Sin City"—would often force his son to focus on writing his own rap music. In 2013, Goulbourne was sent to a juvenile detention center for possession of "around $10 worth of weed", where he met XXXTentacion. The duo became friends and frequently collaborated on songs after being released from detention.

Career

2014–2017: Mainstream debut
Following Goulbourne's release from detention, he formed the rap group "Very Rare" with XXXTentacion and released his first song "Catch Me" on the streaming service SoundCloud. Goulbourne eventually co-founded XXXTentacion's collective Members Only after the release of Members Only Vol. 1, a collaboration mixtape with XXXTentacion, in 2015. The mixtape would eventually be followed up with Members Only, Vol. 2 and then Members Only, Vol. 3 on June 26, 2017.

Goulbourne released multiple singles on the SoundCloud platform including "Catch Me Outside", "Where's the Blow" featuring Lil Pump, "Stunt!" featuring UnoTheActivist, "Life Is Short", "Like a Soccer Mom", "Take a Step Back", and "BabyWipe". Goulbourne has performed twice at the Rolling Loud Festival and has released songs with other artists including Offset, Lil Yachty, A$AP Ferg, Lil Peep, Desiigner, and Denzel Curry. Goulbourne has also collaborated with artists from the 88Rising label including the Higher Brothers and Keith Ape. Goulbourne also worked with Timbaland, who he had previously said was his favorite producer.

In May 2016, Goulbourne released his first mixtape Drown in Designer, which included the songs "Take a Step Back", which was later certified Gold, and "Where's the Blow". In June 2017, Goulbourne released his debut commercial mixtape You Will Regret under Victor Victor Worldwide and Republic Records.

2018–present: Stokeley and Sin City The Mixtape

In May 2018, Goulbourne released his third mixtape Beware the Book of Eli, which featured the single "DoIHaveTheSause?". In June that same year, he was named one of XXLs "2018 Freshman Class". On November 30, 2018, Goulbourne released his debut studio album, Stokeley, which includes the songs "Faucet Failure" and "Nuketown" featuring Juice Wrld. The album peaked at number 6 on the Billboard 200 chart.

Following the success of Stokeley, Goulbourne released only one single in 2019, "Carbonated Water". In July 2020, he released the single "Burn the Hoods" alongside a music video on Lyrical Lemonade. Simultaneously, he announced that his second album would release later that year, however the album was never released. Goulbourne has stated that he plans to release more music to the public.

In May 2021, Goulbourne announced a mixtape titled Sin City The Mixtape to be released in June. He released Sin City on June 25.

Musical style
Goulbourne has said that his musical production has been most influenced by Busta Rhymes, Missy Elliot, and Chief Keef. Goulbourne has also stated he does not have any main musical influences; "I listen to every genre: rap, rock, classical, heavy metal...I listen to Adele sometimes too".

Personal life
As of June 2018, Golbourne lives in Atlanta, Georgia. He had a heart condition that required surgery in March 2018.

In a 2016 interview, Goulbourne signaled support for the legalization of gay marriage. In 2020, Goulbourne expressed distaste for President Donald Trump, comparing him to a white supremacist.

Friendships

XXXTentacion 
Goulbourne was close friends with XXXTentacion before they both started rapping. They met in a juvenile center in 2013. Goulbourne said in an interview with Adam22 that he was surprised by X's criminal charges. Whilst in jail, X had taught Goulbourne about different rapping cadences. After the duo were released, they met up with the intention of committing home invasions but instead began releasing music together. The rappers founded the collective Members Only. In 2017, Goulbourne and XXXTentacion embarked on The Revenge Tour with Craig Xen. The tour was postponed following the shooting of XXXTentacion's cousin. By late 2017, the two had parted ways and begun working on their own projects. Around this time, it was insinuated that the two were feuding.

At the Rolling Loud Miami festival in 2018, Goulbourne and XXXTentacion were reunited, reaffirming their friendship. On June 18, 2018, XXXTentacion was murdered; Goulbourne learned of his best friend's death while on Instagram Live and tearfully informed his fans of the rapper's death.

Juice Wrld 
In early 2018, Goulbourne befriended rising rapper Juice Wrld. The two went on to collaborate on the track "Nuketown", which became Goulbourne's highest charting song on the Billboard Hot 100. It was announced that the two were working on a mixtape titled Evil Twins, but the project never released. In 2019, following the release of Juice Wrld's second album, the two embarked on the Death Race for Love Tour together along with Cole Bennett of Lyrical Lemonade.

On December 8, 2019, Juice Wrld died from an opioid-induced seizure. Goulbourne reacted emotionally to the news of the rapper's death. Goulbourne was present at Juice Wrld's funeral later that month.

Aftermath 
The death of his two best friends in a span of eighteen months had a profound impact on Goulbourne. Following XXXTentacion's death, Goulbourne honored him multiple times during his own concerts; Goulbourne met XXXTentacion's son, Gekyume Onfroy, for the first time in person at a show.

Controversies

Concert incidents
During a concert at The Fonda Theatre, Los Angeles, on April 11, 2017, Goulbourne was pushed off stage and then assaulted by an associate of rapper Rob Stone. The attack was said to be instigated by an ongoing feud between the two rappers, starting when Goulbourne refused to leave the stage during Stone's opening act. Rob Stone was kicked off the remainder of Desiigner's Outlet Tour.

During a concert on August 10, 2018, in Austin, Texas, Goulbourne asked the crowd for a moment of silence for his murdered friend XXXTentacion. An audience member heckled, "Fuck X, that woman-beating piece of shit!" Goulbourne threatened the audience member and told the rest of the audience to "fuck his ass up", leading to a melee fight. While the crowd was beating the man, Goulbourne played one of XXXTentacion's most popular songs, "Look at Me" before the venue's security dispersed the disturbance and escorted the man outside of the venue.

Legal issues
In 2014, Goulbourne was sent to a juvenile detention center for possession of marijuana. Goulbourne was arrested for driving with a suspended license, driving without a license, and robbery in August 2016. He was later released on bail.

Discography

Studio album
 Stokeley (2018)

Collaborative album
 Members Only, Vol. 4 (2019)

Filmography

References

1996 births
American hip hop musicians
American rappers of Jamaican descent
American prisoners and detainees
Republic Records artists
Rappers from Florida
Living people
African-American male rappers
21st-century American rappers
21st-century American male musicians
Southern hip hop musicians
Members Only (hip hop collective) members
21st-century African-American musicians
People from Fort Lauderdale, Florida
American comedy musicians